Maryam Momen (Persianمریم مومن , born July 28, 1998) is an Iranian actress. She is best known for her role as Fakhrolzaman Shalchi in Lady of the Mansion (2018–2019) for which she earned a Hafez Award nomination.

Filmography

Film

Television

Web

Awards and nominations

See also 

 Iranian women
 Iranian cinema

References

External links 

 Maryam Momen at IMDb

Living people
21st-century Iranian actresses
Iranian actresses
Iranian film actresses
Iranian television actresses
Actresses from Tehran
1998 births